The Vandalia Correctional Institution  is a minimum-security state prison for men located in Vandalia, Fayette County, Illinois, owned and operated by the Illinois Department of Corrections.  

The facility was first opened in 1921.  

In 2011 the prison watchdog group John Howard Association released a report highly critical of conditions at Vandalia.  In response prison officials denied the facility was overcrowded, despite 1700 inmates living in a facility approved to hold about 1,100.

References

Prisons in Illinois
Buildings and structures in Fayette County, Illinois
1921 establishments in Illinois